Jarkko is a given name. Notable people with the given name include:

Jarkko Ahola (born 1977), Finnish performing artist, composer and singer
Jarkko Ala-Huikku (born 1980), Finnish Greco-Roman wrestler
Jarkko Hattunen (born 1987), Finnish ice hockey player
Jarkko Hentula (born 1970), Finnish film and television producer
Jarkko Huovila (born 1975), Finnish orienteering competitor
Jarkko Hurme (born 1986), Finnish footballer
Jarkko Immonen (born 1982), Finnish ice hockey player
Jarkko Immonen (ice hockey, born 1984) (born 1984), Finnish ice hockey player
Jarkko Kari, Finnish mathematician and computer scientist
Jarkko Kauppinen (born 1982), Finnish biathlete
Jarkko Kauvosaari (born 1983), Finnish ice hockey player
Jarkko Kinnunen (born 1984), Finnish race walker
Jarkko Komula (born 1976), Finnish darts player
Jarkko Lahdenmäki (born 1991), Finnish footballer
Jarkko Lahti (born 1978), Finnish actor
Jarkko Laine (1947–2006), Finnish poet and writer
Jarkko Laukia, Finnish sport shooter
Jarkko Luiro (born 1998), Finnish footballer
Jarkko Määttä (born 1994), Finnish ski jumper
Jarkko Malinen (born 1988), Finnish ice hockey player
Jarkko Martikainen (born 1970), Finnish singer-songwriter
Jarkko Näppilä (born 1988), Finnish ice hockey player
Jarkko Niemi (actor) (born 1984), Finnish actor
Jarkko Niemi (cyclist) (born 1982), Finnish cyclist
Jarkko Nieminen (born 1981), Finnish tennis player
Jarkko Nikara (born 1986), Finnish rally driver
Jarkko Oikarinen (born 1967), Finnish IT professional
Jarkko Okkonen (born 1978), Finnish footballer
Jarkko Ruutu (born 1975), Finnish ice hockey player
Jarkko Tapola (born 1944), Finnish sprinter
Jarkko Tontti (born 1971), Finnish novelist, poet, essayist and lawyer
Jarkko Värttö (born 1989), Finnish footballer
Jarkko Varvio (born 1972), Finnish ice hockey player
Jarkko Wiss (born 1972), Finnish footballer

Finnish masculine given names